The 2010 season was the 32nd season in Kuala Lumpur's existence, and their second consecutive year in the top flight of Malaysian football.

Kuala Lumpur finished ninth in the Malaysian Super League in the year following promotion from the Malaysian Premier League and reached the second round of the Malaysian FA Cup in season 2010. KL qualified for the Malaysia Cup where they ended bottom of Group B in the first round.

Results and fixtures

Super League

FA Cup

Malaysia Cup

Friendly matches
Note: scores are written KL first.

*Match abandoned at half-time due to heavy rain

Table

Malaysia Super League

Malaysia Cup Group B

Squad statistics

Only lists players who made an appearance or were on the bench.

Transfers

In

Out

References

2009
Kuala Lumpur